The A179 is the major link road between the A19 and Hartlepool via Hart Village. This road has a good view of the Tees valley behind some of the biggest wind turbines in the UK.

References

Roads in England
Transport in County Durham